Kamen Rider Kabuto is the 2006 edition of the Kamen Rider Series, and the 35th anniversary of the whole series'. Lasting for 49 episodes, the first episode of Kamen Rider Kabuto aired on January 29, 2006, and the finale aired on January 21, 2007.

Episodes

See also

Kabuto